Binod Jaiswal is an Indian politician from Bihar. He has been a member of Bihar Legislative Council since 10 March 2022, representing Siwan. He is a member Rashtriya Janata Dal.

References

Members of the Bihar Legislative Council
Year of birth missing (living people)
Living people